The 2010 Edmonton municipal election was held Monday, October 18, 2010 to elect a mayor and 12 councillors to the city council, seven of the nine trustees to Edmonton Public Schools, and the seven trustees to the Edmonton Catholic Schools. Two incumbent public school trustees had no challengers. Since 1968, provincial legislation had required every municipality to hold triennial elections.

On July 22, 2009, City Council voted to change the electoral system of six wards to a system of 12 wards; each represented by a single councillor, the changes took effect for the 2010 election. Of the estimated 596,406 eligible voters, only 199,359 turned in a ballot, a voter turnout of 33.4%. A municipal census conducted in 2009 showed a population of 782,439, meaning approximately 76.2% of the population was eligible to vote.

Candidates
Bold indicates elected, italics indicates incumbent.

Mayor

Councillors

Public school trustees

Separate school trustees

Candidate summaries

Mayor
Daryl Bonar - Canadian Forces lieutenant and real estate investor
David Dorward - Chartered Accountant, Primary Owner of Edmonton Energy IBL basketball team
Dave Dowling - Sales, Lapidary art worker
Dan Dromarsky - Commercial Accounts Manager
Bob Ligertwood - Small business owner, agriculture and heavy industry
Andrew Lineker - PR & administration for three entertainment facilities
Stephen Mandel - incumbent

Ward 1
Andrew Knack - finished third in the 2007 Ward 1 race
Jamie Kenneth Post - I.T. Consultant
Linda Sloan - incumbent

Ward 2
Thomas Hinderks - director of the Alberta Aviation Museum
Don Koziak - hotel owner; only significant competition in 2007 mayor race, finished fourth in the 2004 Ward 2 race
Kim Krushell - incumbent
Roxie Malone-Richards - community activist, advocate for the disabled and those with mobility issues and a former 630 CHED broadcaster
Shelley Tupper - finished fourth in the 2007 Ward 2 race
Michael Waddy - Entrepreneur, web designer

Ward 3
Kim Cassady - ran as an Alberta Liberal candidate in Edmonton-Highlands-Norwood during the 2001 provincial election
Terry Demers - Ron Hayter's assistant
Shawn Philip Fairbridge - 
Dave Loken - finished third in 2007 and 2004 in Ward 2
Hatem Naboulsi - Businessman
John (Giovanni) Oplanich - land developer
Greg Silver - Paramedic
Louis Sobolewski - Auditor
Michael Suess - Market & finance

Ward 4
Ken Atkinson - former member of the Canadian Armed Forces
Dan Backs - former Liberal member of the Legislative Assembly of Alberta, later sought a provincial Progressive Conservative nomination 
Ed Gibbons - incumbent
Hafsa Goma - a former MLA
Scott Robb -

Ward 5
Steve Bergeron - Real estate investor
Mark Grandish - Tow-truck driver
Brian Kendrick - general contractor 
Karen Leibovici - incumbent

Ward 6
Cris Basualdo - Edmonton District Labour Council endorsement.
Jane Batty - incumbent
Carla Frost - 
James Johnson - Wildrose Alliance staffer
Bryan George Kapitza - CSU 52 endorsement. Former unionist / current small business owner.
Lee Permann - Operations Manager
Adil Pirbhai - finished twelfth in the 2007 Ward 4 race
Thomas Roberts -

Ward 7
Tony Caterina - incumbent
Scott McKeen - former Edmonton Journal columnist
Grant David Pullishy - Brewery worker
Terry Rolls - Assistant shipper/receiver at NAIT, garbageman, writer
Brendan Van Alstine - social worker

Ward 8
Duane Good Striker - 
Ben Henderson - incumbent
Lori Jeffery-Heaney - finished fifth in the 2007 Ward 6 race
Sheila Mckay - finished fifth in the 2007 Ward 4 race
Hana Razga - finished sixth in the 2007 Ward 4 race

Ward 9
Bryan Kent Anderson - incumbent
Rami Bader - 
Calvin Lim - Financial advisor, insurance broker
Jennifer Watts -

Ward 10
Don Iveson - incumbent
Al Slemko - finished fourth in the 2004 Ward 5 race

Ward 11
Shane Bergdahl - Chair of the Mill Woods Presidents' Council (association of community leagues)
Kerry Diotte - former Edmonton SUN columnist
Vishal Luthra - 1998 Youth Justice Committee member
Roberto Maglalang - HR Director/Manager
Chinwe Okelu - Alberta Government, Department of Housing
Brent Schaffrick - Twelve years in Canadian Primary Naval Reserve

Ward 12
Vikram Bagga - Owner of Bagga Jeweller
Gerry Horn - Worked as a bricklayer, some carpentry, and general construction
Chuck McKenna - finished fourth in the 2007 Ward 6 race
Amarjeet Sohi - incumbent

References

External links
 City of Edmonton: Edmonton Elections

2010
2010 Alberta municipal elections